The 1955 Football Championship of UkrSSR were part of the 1955 Soviet republican football competitions in the Soviet Ukraine.

Qualification group stage

Group 1

Group 2

Group 3

Group 4

Group 5

Group 6

Final

Promotion play-off
 DOF Sevastopol – FC Spartak Stanislav 2:0 0:2 0:2

References

External links
 1955. Football Championship of the UkrSSR (1955. Первенство УССР.) Luhansk Nash Futbol.
 Group 1: ukr-football.org.ua
 Group 2: ukr-football.org.ua
 Group 3: ukr-football.org.ua
 Group 4: ukr-football.org.ua
 Group 5: ukr-football.org.ua
 Group 6: ukr-football.org.ua
 Final: ukr-football.org.ua

Ukraine
Football Championship of the Ukrainian SSR
Championship